Rumiñahui (Kichwa rumi stone, rock, ñawi eye, face, "stone eye", "stone face", "rock eye" or "rock face", Hispanicized spelling Rumiñahui) is a dormant, heavily eroded stratovolcano  above sea level. Situated in the Andes mountains 40 km south of Quito, Ecuador, it is overshadowed by its famous neighbour Cotopaxi.

See also

 Rumiñahui
Lists of volcanoes
List of volcanoes in Ecuador
List of stratovolcanoes
Latagunga

Sources

External links 
 photos and general information on the mountain
 

Rumiñahui Canton
Stratovolcanoes of Ecuador
Four-thousanders of the Andes
Pleistocene stratovolcanoes